Robert Schmitz may refer to:

 E. Robert Schmitz (1889–1949), Franco-American pianist and composer
 Robert J. Schmitz, American plant biologist and epigenomicist
 Robert J. Schmitz (politician) (1921–1999), American farmer, businessman, and politician in Minnesota